Fred Hilton (born January 15, 1948) is a retired professional basketball shooting guard who played two seasons in the National Basketball Association (NBA) as a member of the Buffalo Braves (1971–73). He attended Grambling State University where he was drafted in the second round of the 1971 NBA draft by the Braves.

He has six children, sons Anthony (b. 1968), Patrick and Dallas (b. 1983) and daughters Shantrice (b. 1979), Charity (b. 1982) and Cherish (b. 1982).

External links

1948 births
Living people
American men's basketball players
Basketball players from Baton Rouge, Louisiana
Buffalo Braves draft picks
Buffalo Braves players
Grambling State Tigers men's basketball players
Parade High School All-Americans (boys' basketball)
Shooting guards